Shuswap Lake (pronounced  /ˈʃuːʃwɑːp/) is a lake located in the southern interior of British Columbia, Canada that drains via the Little Shuswap River into Little Shuswap Lake.  Little Shuswap Lake is the source of the South Thompson River, a branch of the Thompson River, a tributary of the Fraser River.  It is at the heart of a region known as the Columbia Shuswap or "the Shuswap", noted for its recreational lakeshore communities including the city of Salmon Arm.  The name "Shuswap" is derived from the Shuswap or Secwepemc First Nations people, the most northern of the Interior Salish peoples, whose territory includes the Shuswap. The Shuswap call themselves /ʃǝxwépmǝx/ in their own language, which is called /ʃǝxwepmǝxtʃín/.

Geography
The central interior plateau of British Columbia drained by the Fraser and Okanagan rivers is part of the Shuswap terrane in British Columbia and northern Washington state. It is dissected by numerous elongated, glacially-overdeepened lake basins which are formed by the same mechanisms as coastal fjords.

Shuswap Lake consists of four arms, forming a shape reminiscent of the letter H. The four arms are called Salmon Arm (southwest), Shuswap Arm (west), Anstey Arm (northeast), and Seymour Arm (north). Shuswap Lake connects to Little Shuswap Lake via the Little River, which flows from the end of Shuswap Lake.

To the north-west it is fed by the Adams River, which drains Adams Lake. The Salmon Arm of Shuswap Lake connects to Mara Lake at the Sicamous Channel. The Shuswap River connects via Mara Lake. In the south-west the Salmon River flows into the lake at Salmon Arm. The Eagle River runs down from the Eagle Pass in the Monashees to enter the lake at Sicamous, in the east. The Seymour River empties into the northern end of the Seymour Arm. In addition to these rivers, numerous creeks feed the lake, including Scotch Creek, which runs south to the north shore of the main arm, near the community of the same name.

Ecology

Fish
Shuswap Lake is home to at least fourteen species of fish. Of these species, the Chinook salmon, Coho salmon, Sockeye salmon, Rainbow trout, Lake trout, and Burbot are of importance regarding recreational fishing.

Invasive Species
Eurasian water milfoil has spread across much of the lake, but is most prevalent in Salmon Arm Bay. Carp may also be present.

Monster
Like many other lakes, Shuswap Lake has a local lake monster legend attached to it. A 25-foot-long serpentine creature, known as the Shuswap Lake Monster, "Shugumu", or "Shuswaggi", is reported to live in the lake.

Provincial parks around Shuswap Lake 
Several parks are located on the shores of Shuswap Lake, including:
 Shuswap Lake Provincial Park
 Shuswap Lake Marine Provincial Park
 Silver Beach Provincial Park
Tsútswecw Provincial Park (home of the Adams River Sockeye Run)
 Cinnemousun Narrows Provincial Park (located at the center of the H)

Communities
Communities bordering the Shuswap Lakes include:
 Salmon Arm
 Celista
 Lee Creek
 Squilax
 Eagle Bay
 Scotch Creek
 Sorrento
 Blind Bay
 Tappen
 Anglemont
 Magna Bay
 Chase
 St. Ives
 SunnyBrae
 Canoe
 Sicamous
 Seymour Arm

References

Further reading

External links 

Lakes of British Columbia
Salmon Arm
Kamloops Division Yale Land District